Ivo Staš (born 10 February 1965) is a retired Czech football defender.

References

1965 births
Living people
Czech footballers
FC Baník Ostrava players
Dukla Prague footballers
Aston Villa F.C. players
FK Drnovice players
MFK Vítkovice players
Czech First League players
Association football defenders
Czech expatriate footballers
Expatriate footballers in England
Czech expatriate sportspeople in England
Czechoslovakia under-21 international footballers
Czechoslovakia international footballers
Sportspeople from Ostrava